Jawed Iqbal (born Sialkot, Punjab) is a newspaper, print media cartoonist of Pakistan.

Early life and career
Jawed Iqbal was born at Sialkot, Punjab, Pakistan. He has professional experience of 38 years. Jawed Iqbal is associated with Daily Jang, the Urdu newspaper with the largest circulation within Pakistan and overseas. Jawed's approach is modern and cartoons fresh which is very hard to maintain for a cartoonist over three decades. Pakistan has very strict blasphemy laws and also a culture of political violence. Cartoonists in Pakistan have to be careful when making their cartoons. Still Pakistani cartoonists find ways to make fun of people in power and also the religious extremists. Jawed Iqbal says he does not make fun of religion and sex. Instead, his focus is on common man and his everyday problems. His cartoons are about rolling power outages, gas shortages and current political personalities. Jawed Iqbal also says that a cartoon should leave an instant impact on the viewer. He adds that a cartoonist has to sugarcoat a bitter fact and present it in a funny way to the public. Without offending people or humiliating them, a good cartoonist entertains and informs the public. This was the consensus view of a panel of Pakistani cartoonists in 2015 who met at Alhamra Arts Council, Lahore, Pakistan.

Writings
He is the author of eight books of which two were very popular travelogues: Modern Ibn-e-Batuta and Modern Columbus.

Awards and recognition
 Pride of Performance award by the President of Pakistan in 1992.

See also 
List of Pakistani journalists

References

External links 
 Cartoonist Jawed Iqbal's interview on YouTube 

Living people
People from Sialkot
Pakistani cartoonists
Pakistani male journalists
Pakistani columnists
Punjabi people
Recipients of the Pride of Performance
Year of birth missing (living people)